Platoon is an action game developed by Ocean Software and published by Data East for the Amiga, Amstrad CPC, Apple II, Atari ST, Commodore 64, PC DOS and ZX Spectrum in 1987–1988. The NES version was ported and published by Sunsoft in September 1988. It was the first video game adaptation of the 1986 war film Platoon, followed by the 2002 game.

Gameplay
In Stage 1, the player is in a jungle with a side-scrolling element. The player is able to navigate vertically and horizontally through the screens. The player must also avoid getting hit by enemies, landing on explosive mines, as well as dodge any booby traps in the way. The goal of the first stage is to find the explosives buried deep within the jungle and then navigate out and plant the explosives on the bridge. After planting the explosives, the player will be in a town and must find a torch and a map of the tunnel system for the next level.

In Stage 2, the player is now in a tunnel system and the point of view has changed to a first-person shooter. The player is able to navigate through the tunnel system using the map obtained earlier in stage 1. The player must navigate through the tunnel system and collect flares and a compass along the way. Enemies will continuously appear on the screen and the player must kill them quickly in order to advance through the tunnel system.

In Stage 3, the player is stuck in a bunker overnight that is under constant siege by enemy AI. The player must use flares obtained in the tunnel system in order to see enemy AI outside the bunker to be able to shoot them. The player is still in first-person mode and must navigate the cross-hair onto the enemy players in order to shoot at them. A skilled player could make out the silhouettes of enemies amongst the background without the need for flares. As long as the player survives the siege, the level will be successfully completed by the player.

In Stage 4, the player is now navigating through the jungle in a third-person view. The player has 4 minutes to complete this level and must navigate through the jungle while killing enemies as well as avoiding sniper fire. The compass obtained in the tunnel system is used here to help the player navigate through the jungle. At the end of the jungle is the game's boss, Sergeant Barnes, who is held up in a brick bunker and shooting at the player. The player must be able to land five grenade shots to defeat Sergeant Barnes.

Reception

References

External links

Platoon at World Of Spectrum
Platoon at Lemon 64

1987 video games
Amiga games
Amstrad CPC games
Apple II games
Atari ST games
Commodore 64 games
Data East video games
DOS games
First-person shooters
Nintendo Entertainment System games
Run and gun games
Vietnam War video games
Video games set in Vietnam
Video games based on films
Video games scored by Naoki Kodaka
ZX Spectrum games
Ocean Software games
Video games developed in the United Kingdom